Acheilognathus melanogaster is a species of brackish, freshwater ray-finned fish in the genus Acheilognathus.  It is endemic to Japan.

References

Acheilognathus
Fish described in 1860
Freshwater fish of Japan